East Chatham is a hamlet located partly in the town of Chatham and partly in the town of Canaan, in the state of New York, United States. It is located at the crossroads of a railroad, Interstate 90, and the Taconic State Parkway.

East Chatham is the site of Vovcha Tropa, a campsite owned by Plast, the Ukrainian Scouting Organization. This camp is attended by several hundred scouts.

The Rowe-Lant Farm was added to the National Register of Historic Places in 2010.

Notable person

Painter Emma Jane Cady was born in East Chatham.

References

Hamlets in New York (state)
Hamlets in Columbia County, New York